Bosnia and Herzegovina is a signatory of Vienna Convention on Road Signs and Signals. Therefore, road signs do not differ much from the rest of Europe. Ministry of Transportation of Bosnia and Herzegovina regulates them.

Priority signs

Warning signs

Prohibitory signs

Mandatory signs

Guide signs

Indication signs

Highway and Expressway signs

Direction signs

Border crossing signs

Checkpoint signs

References 
http://www.automotivecenter.ba/downloads/regulativa/bih/pravilnici/18.PRAVILNIK%20%20o%20saobracajnim%20znakovima%20SGBiH%2016-07.pdf

Bosnia and Herzegovina